Charles Yingling (born November 7, 1978) is an American producer and recording/mix/mastering engineer living in Nashville, Tennessee most noted for his work engineering the Willie Nelson track “Lost Highway” which won a Grammy Award in 2007.

Yingling produces acts and has engineered alongside producer Brent Maher on projects from artists including Merle Haggard, Willie Nelson, Ray Price, Gareth Dunlop, and SHEL most often working on analog tape and a Trident TSM 1978 console.

Discography

References

External links
 Charles Yingling on AllMusic
 Charles Yingling on The Blueroom Studios

1978 births
Living people
American audio engineers
Audio production engineers
Record producers from Texas